Gilbert "Ghisto" Khunwane (born 15 June 1977 in Mmankgodi) is a male retired boxer from Botswana, who competed at the 2000 Summer Olympics in Sydney, Australia. There he was eliminated in the first round of the men's lightweight (– 60 kg) division by Mexico's eventual bronze medalist Cristian Bejarano.

Khunwane won a bronze medal at the 2002 Commonwealth Games in Manchester. He carried the flag for his native country at the opening ceremony of the 2000 Summer Olympics in Sydney, Australia before retiring from the sport in 2005 to become a coach. He was Botswana national boxing team captain and assistant coach.

He was appointed Vice President of the Botswana Boxing Association in February 2019.

References

External links
 

1977 births
Living people
Lightweight boxers
Botswana male boxers
Boxers at the 1998 Commonwealth Games
Boxers at the 2002 Commonwealth Games
Boxers at the 2000 Summer Olympics
Olympic boxers of Botswana
Commonwealth Games bronze medallists for Botswana
Commonwealth Games medallists in boxing
African Games bronze medalists for Botswana
African Games medalists in boxing
Competitors at the 1999 All-Africa Games
Botswana sports coaches
Medallists at the 2002 Commonwealth Games